Ōzora, Ozora, Oozora or Ohzora (written: 大空) is a Japanese surname. Notable people with the surname include:

, Japanese voice actress

Fictional characters
, a character in the anime series Aikatsu!
, a character in the anime series Kaidan Restaurant
, a character in the manga series Harukana Receive
, titular character of the manga series Stop!! Hibari-kun!
, protagonist of the manga series Captain Tsubasa
, a character in the anime series Digimon Universe: Appli Monsters

Japanese-language surnames